Tânia Mara Araújo Almeida (born 9 February 1983) is a Brazilian singer and actress.

Music career
Mara is best known for the songs "Se Quiser", a cover of Kelly Clarkson's 2003 song "Anytime" included on the soundtrack to the telenovela Páginas da Vida, and "Sonho Lindo", which is used as the theme for the telenovela Desejo Proibido.

She is married to Jayme Monjardim, film director and director of Rede Globo network soap operas. In September 2010, Mara gave birth to their first child, a daughter, named after Monjardim's famous mother, Maysa.

Discography

Studio albums

Live albums

Singles

Soundtracks

References

External links

Official website

1983 births
Brazilian pop singers
Living people
People from Brasília
Brazilian actresses
Brazilian television presenters
21st-century Brazilian singers
21st-century Brazilian women singers
Brazilian women television presenters
Women in Latin music